Ozamia punicans is a species of snout moth in the genus Ozamia. It was described by Carl Heinrich in 1939. It is found in Argentina and possibly southern Brazil.

The wingspan is 36–44 mm. The forewings are light grey with several yellow blotches and the hindwings are white with slight fuscous shading. Adults have been recorded in the second half of October.

The larvae feed on Cereus validus. They live solitarily in rather large cells in the stems of their host plant. Pupation takes place in a cocoon which is made within the larval cavity. The larvae are olive green.

References

Moths described in 1939
Phycitini